Husniddin Gofurov (born 29 July 1994) is an Uzbek footballer playing with Surkhon Termez, on loan from Pakhtakor Tashkent FK.

Club career
Born in Fergana, he played in 2012-13 with NBU Osiyo in Uzbekistan before moving to Serbia. In 2013, he became the best goal scorer of NBU Osiyo in Uzbekistan First League, scoring 14 goals totally and 13 of them in first phase of championship. In summer 2013 he signed a 3-year contract with FK Javor Ivanjica.  On August 31, 2013, he made his debut in the 2013–14 Serbian SuperLiga as a started in a fourth-round match against FK Spartak Zlatibor Voda.

On 15 January 2018 Gafurov signed two year contract with PFC Lokomotiv Tashkent. He won the 2018 Uzbekistan Super League and the 2019 Uzbekistan Super Cup with Lokomotiv. Next, on 21 July 2019, he signed with rivals Pakhtakor Tashkent FK.

International career
Gafurov was part of the Uzbekistan U-17 team camp in May 2013.

On 19 May 2014 Gafurov was called up for friendly match against Oman.

He made his official debut for national team on 27 May 2014 for match against Oman, playing in starting line-up.

In 2016, he had plenty of activity at youth level. In January, he was member of the Uzbekistan U-23 team at the 2016 AFC U-23 Championship, and, in October, he was member of was member of Uzbekistan U-19 at the 2016 AFC U-19 Championship.

International goals

Honours
Lokomotiv Tashkent
Uzbekistan Super League: 2018
Uzbekistan Super Cup: 2019

Pakhtakor Tashkent
Uzbekistan Super League: 2019
Uzbek Cup: 2019

References

External links
 
 
 

1994 births
Living people
People from Fergana
Uzbekistani footballers
Uzbekistan international footballers
Uzbekistani expatriate footballers
Association football forwards
FK Javor Ivanjica players
FK Mladost Lučani players
Serbian First League players
Serbian SuperLiga players
Expatriate footballers in Serbia
Uzbekistani expatriate sportspeople in Serbia
Pakhtakor Tashkent FK players
PFC Lokomotiv Tashkent players
Surkhon Termez players
Uzbekistan Super League players